Shao Tingting (born 9 February 1985 in Hubei) is a female Chinese basketball player who was part of the team that won the gold medal at the WCBA. She competed at the 2008 Summer Olympics in Beijing.

References
http://2008teamchina.olympic.cn/index.php/personview/personsen/4821

1985 births
Living people
Basketball players at the 2008 Summer Olympics
Chinese women's basketball players
Olympic basketball players of China
Basketball players from Hubei
People from Huangshi
Bayi Kylin players